A beachhead is the line created when a military unit reaches a beach by sea and begins to defend that area of beach.

Beachhead or Beach Head may also refer to:

Beachhead (film) a 1954 film starring Tony Curtis and Frank Lovejoy
"Beachhead" (Stargate SG-1), a Stargate SG-1 episode
Beach Head (G.I. Joe), a fictional character in the G.I. Joe universe
Beach Head (video game), a 1983 video game
Beach Head II: The Dictator Strikes Back, a 1985 sequel to the video game
Games developed by Digital Fusion Inc.
 Beach Head 2000, a remake of the 1983 game
 Beach Head 2002
 Beachhead (board game), a 1980 board wargame from Yaquinto

See also
 Beachy Head, a chalk headland in East Sussex, England